Vera Begić (born 17 March 1982 in Rijeka, SR Croatia, SFR Yugoslavia) is Croatian athlete specialized in discus throwing discipline. Since Vera's mother Jadranka Antunović also was a successful athlete and member of the national team in Yugoslavia (long jump, pentathlon), Vera has been connected to athletics from the early childhood. At the age of 12 she decided to take the discus throwing for her preferred athletic discipline, and soon achieved very good results in the junior level of competition.

Vera broke the Croatian record for 21 times, ten of these in senior category, and she was champion of Croatia for twelve continuous years. Her personal best result of 61.52 m was achieved in May 2009 (Bar, Montenegro).

Vera Begić Blečić caused a deadly accident on 15 August 2018 while driving under the influence of alcohol (1,9 blood alcohol level - BAC) and driving the wrong way on the highway for more than 9 km she struck one car but continued driving until hitting another car with a couple and 10y old child inside. After the accident she exited the car walked to the victim's car and even though she heard cries for help she just returned to her car and waited for the police. The father of the 10y I.S. died in this accident the mother and child were injured. In October 2019 she was sentenced to 4 years of prison (the maximum penalty for this is 15y).

Other activity
Vera has achieved the Master of Laws degree; she can communicate in fluent English and can also speak Russian, Hungarian and Italian.

Achievements

External links 

1982 births
Living people
Croatian female discus throwers
Athletes (track and field) at the 2004 Summer Olympics
Athletes (track and field) at the 2008 Summer Olympics
Olympic athletes of Croatia
Sportspeople from Rijeka
Mediterranean Games silver medalists for Croatia
Mediterranean Games bronze medalists for Croatia
Athletes (track and field) at the 2005 Mediterranean Games
Athletes (track and field) at the 2009 Mediterranean Games
Mediterranean Games medalists in athletics
World Athletics Championships athletes for Croatia